The 2014 Canadian Open of Curling was held from December 9 to 14 at the Gallagher Centre in Yorkton, Saskatchewan. The Canadian Open was the third men's Grand Slam and the fourth women's Grand Slam of the 2014–15 curling season.

Men

Teams
The teams are listed as follows:

Knockout results
The draw is listed as follows:

A event

B event

C event

Knockout results
All times listed in Central Standard Time (UTC−6).

Draw 1
Tuesday, December 9, 7:00 pm

Draw 3
Wednesday, December 10, 1:00 pm

Draw 4
Wednesday, December 10, 5:00 pm

Draw 5
Wednesday, December 10, 8:30 pm

Draw 7
Thursday, December 11, 11:00 am

Draw 9
Thursday, December 11, 6:30 pm

Draw 10
Friday, December 12, 8:00 am

Draw 11
Friday, December 12, 11:00 am

Draw 12
Friday, December 12, 2:30 pm

Draw 13
Friday, December 12, 6:30 pm

Draw 14
Saturday, December 13, 8:30 am

Playoffs

Quarterfinals
Saturday, December 6, 12:00 pm

Semifinals
Saturday, December 6, 8:30 pm

Final
Sunday, December 7, 12:00 pm

Women

Teams
The teams are listed as follows:

Knockout results
The draw is listed as follows:

A event

B event

C event

Knockout results
All times listed in Central Standard Time (UTC−6).

Draw 1
Tuesday, December 9, 7:00 pm

Draw 2
Wednesday, December 10, 9:30 am

Draw 4
Wednesday, December 10, 5:00 pm

Draw 6
Thursday, December 11, 8:00 am

Draw 8
Thursday, December 11, 2:30 pm

Draw 9
Thursday, December 11, 6:30 pm

Draw 10
Friday, December 12, 8:00 am

Draw 11
Friday, December 12, 11:00 am

Draw 12
Friday, December 12, 2:30 pm

Draw 13
Friday, December 12, 6:30 pm

Playoffs

Quarterfinals
Saturday, December 6, 5:00 pm

Semifinals
Saturday, December 6, 8:30 pm

Final
Sunday, December 7, 5:00 pm

References

External links

2014
Canadian Open of Curling, 2014
Sport in Yorkton
Canadian Open of Curling, 2014
Canadian Open of Curling, 2014
Canadian Open of Curling, 2014